The 1978 Copa Fraternidad was the 8th edition of the Copa Fraternidad, the football competition for Central American clubs organized by UNCAF.  Costa Rican club Deportivo Saprissa obtained its 3rd regional title after winning the final round.

Teams

First round

 Saprissa advanced 3–1 on aggregate.

 FAS advanced 2–0 on aggregate.

 Barrio México 1–1 Municipal on aggregate.  Barrio México won 3–1 on penalty shoot-outs

 Cartaginés 1–1 Juventud Olímpica on aggregate.  Cartaginés won 5–4 on penalty shoot-outs

 Tiquisate advanced 2–1 on aggregate.

 Comunicaciones advanced 3–0 on aggregate.

Second round
Apparently Saprissa, Cartaginés and Comunicaciones eliminated FAS, Barrio México and Tiquisate in a semifinal round.

Final round

Champion

References

1978
1
1977–78 in Salvadoran football
1977–78 in Guatemalan football
1977–78 in Costa Rican football